B.A.P.S (an acronym for Black American Princesses) is a 1997 American female buddy comedy film directed by Robert Townsend and starring Halle Berry, Natalie Desselle, and Martin Landau. The film was written by Troy Byer and was her first screenplay. The film received largely negative reviews from critics, although it has since been considered a cult classic, especially for Black Hollywood. In total it earned $7.3 million at the box office worldwide.

The film features several celebrity cameos, including LL Cool J, Leon Robinson, Heavy D, and Dennis Rodman.

Plot
Denise "Nisi" (Halle Berry) and Tamika "Mickey" (Natalie Desselle) work at a soul food diner in Decatur, Georgia. Their plan is to one day open the world's first combination hair salon and soul food restaurant if they ever get enough money. Their boyfriends, Ali (Pierre Edwards) and James (A.J. Johnson), hope to one day own a luxury cab company.

Nisi and Mickey hear about a contest for a video girl where the winner gets $10,000 and spend all their savings to fly to Los Angeles for Nisi to compete. On the plane ride there, Nisi reads a book on etiquette and she and Mickey discuss their new hairstyles, which are so tall they block the movie projector.

Although Nisi does not land the dancing girl role, a man named Antonio spots them at the auditions and offers them the same amount of money to be in a different music video and invites them to a Beverly Hills mansion. Once they arrive, they learn about the real reason they were brought there, which was for Nisi to pretend to be the granddaughter of a woman the owner of the house, an aging Mr. Blakemore (Martin Landau), once loved when he was younger named Lily. They agree to the plan, but eventually grow fond of Mr. Blakemore and take care of him and refuse to take his money.

Feeling guilty for deceiving Mr. Blakemore, they plan to return to Decatur and leave a confession letter for him to read after they are gone. However, before they can depart, Mr. Blakemore is rushed to the hospital. Nisi tries to confess to him at his bedside but he silences her before she can finish and passes away soon afterwards. Mr. Blakemore's lawyer, Tracy Shaw (Troy Byer), informs them that he knew all along that Nisi was not Lily's granddaughter because Lily never had any children.

Back at the mansion, Nisi, Mickey, and their boyfriends are preparing to return to Decatur. Mr. Blakemore's lawyer arrives and read's his last will and testament, in which he calls the girls his "B.A.P.S", short for Black American Princesses, and gives them some portion of his wealth. The film ends with Nisi and Mickey opening their combination hair salon and restaurant, which they name "Lily'z".

Cast
 Halle Berry as  Denise “Nisi”
 Martin Landau as  Mr. Donald Blakemore
 Ian Richardson as Mr. Manley
 Natalie Desselle-Reid as  Tamika “Mickey”
 Troy Byer as  Tracy Shaw
 Luigi Amodeo as  Antonio
 Jonathan Fried as  Isaac
 Pierre Edwards as  Ali
 A.J. Johnson as  James
 Bernie Mac as  Mr. Johnson
 Faizon Love as  Tiger J
 Rudy Ray Moore as  Nate
 LL Cool J as himself, cameo
 Howard Hewett as himself, cameo
 Leon Robinson as himself, cameo
 Heavy D as himself, cameo
 Dennis Rodman as himself, cameo

Production
The film was the first screenplay written by former actress Troy Byer.

Writer Beyer was disappointed by the final cut of the film, and believed that her "words had not honestly made it onto the screen". She explained that this was the first time Robert Townsend had directed a film that he had not written. She used her earnings from this film to direct her first film.

Reception

Critical response
Initial reception was overwhelmingly negative. On Rotten Tomatoes, the film has a score of 15% based on 33 reviews. Audiences surveyed by CinemaScore gave the film a grade B.

Roger Ebert gave the film a rare no-stars rating, calling it "jaw-droppingly bad and stupid". Ebert included the film on his "most hated" list.
Janet Maslin praised Halle Berry for her comedic performance and described the film as a "watered-down Pretty Woman". Maslin concluded "It's good for a half-hour of humor before the fun starts to dissolve." Esther Iverem of The Washington Post wrote "Despite its idiotic promotional trailers, 'BAPS' is a very funny movie." Lisa Alspector of the Chicago Reader called it "absurdly broad comedy infused with classic emotions and set in sumptuously detailed environments".

In 2018, Anne Cohen of the website Refinery29 called the film a "Black cult classic" and said the film deserved better than its (at the time) 13% rating on Rotten Tomatoes. Cohen said "The fact that the film has had such a lasting impact,... proves that the film spoke to its audience."

Accolades
1998 Acapulco Black Film Festival
 Best Actress – Halle Berry (nominated)
1997 Stinkers Bad Movie Awards
 Worst Actress - Halle Berry (nominated)

Stage play adaptation 
B.A.P.S. is in development to be produced as a live stage play in 2023 from film producer and playwright Je'Caryous Johnson, who also adapted to the stage other urban movies such as Two Can Play That Game (2017), Set It Off (2018) and  New Jack City (2022). The play was originally slated to open in May 2020, however the COVID-19 pandemic forced the production to close.

References

External links

 
 

1997 films
1990s buddy comedy films
American buddy comedy films
American female buddy films
Films directed by Robert Townsend
Films scored by Stanley Clarke
Films set in Beverly Hills, California
Films set in Georgia (U.S. state)
Films set in Los Angeles
New Line Cinema films
African-American comedy films
1997 comedy films
1990s English-language films
1990s female buddy films
1990s American films